Eddie G. Cole (October 14, 1919 – June 24, 2015) was an American football player and coach. He served as the head football coach at the College of Idaho in Caldwell, Idaho from 1951 to 1952, compiling a record of 12–5–1.

Cole was a graduate of the University of California, Santa Barbara.

Head coaching record

References

1919 births
2015 deaths
College of Idaho Coyotes football coaches
UC Santa Barbara Gauchos football players
People from Waxahachie, Texas
Players of American football from Texas